Hidayatullah is an Arabic male given name composed of the elements Hidayah and Allah, meaning guidance of God. It may refer to:

People
Syarif Hidayatullah, original name of Sunan Gunungjati (1448–1580), founder of the Sultanate of Banten, Indonesia
Sultan Hidayatullah II of Banjar 1822–1904, a sultan of the Sultanate of Banjar, Indonesia
Ghulam Hussain Hidayatullah (died 1948), Pakistani politician
Mohammad Hidayatullah (1905–1992), Chief Justice of India
Hidayatullah (singer) (1940–2019), Pakistani folk musician, playback singer

Organizations
Hidayatullah National Law University, University in Chhattisgarh, India
Jakarta Islamic State Syarif Hidayatullah University, or Jakarta Islamic State University, Indonesia
Hidayatullah (Islamic organization), Indonesian religious and political movement

Businesses
Suara Hidayatullah, an Indonesian Islamic magazine

Arabic masculine given names